Carleton is a suburb of the town of Penrith, Cumbria, England, that has seen a huge growth in housing since the 1960s and is, of 2018, still expanding due to the Carleton Meadows, Carleton Manor and Woodberry Heights developments. It was formerly a separate small village or hamlet one mile east of the centre of Penrith.


Etymology 
The name 'Carleton' originates from Old English 'ceorl' or 'carle', 'charle', meaning 'farmer' or 'free peasant' and 'tūn' a 'vill' or 'settlement'; its meaning therefore is "settlement of the farmers". The name Carleton, Carlton or Charlton is quite common in England, the nearest other example being the village of Carleton on the outskirts of Carlisle. Two more in Cumbria are one close to Egremont and another possible one near Cockermouth. All are located near to what were feudal estate centres. It has been suggested that these settlements pre-dated the Norman conquest, but this has been challenged and some, at least, may be Norman in nature.

Carleton Village 
Carleton Village itself is a small line of houses along one side of the A686 road that forms part of the boundary of the town's built up area; at the junction of the A686 and Carleton Road (formerly the A66 road) and a lane leading down to Frenchfield is  the Cross Keys Inn (which was for a short time in the early 21st century known as the Carleton Inn and was closed between 2004 and 2008).

High Carleton and other developments
On the other side of the A686 road and to the east of Carleton Road is the large High Carleton housing estate which was started in the 1960s and is still growing. (Previous to this estate being built, the area was an old army camp which after World War II was inhabited by dispossessed Polish nationals as well as people on the housing waiting lists for the area).  The estate is subdivided into the Frenchfield Way/Frenchfield Gardens area, the original High Carleton area, Carleton Park or Parklands, Carleton Meadows and Carleton Heights. Most of the streets in this area are named after trees or other plants e.g.: Oak Road, Sycamore Drive, Juniper Way. A small stream runs through the estate. Oak Road connects Carleton with the neighbouring estates of Meadow Croft and Scaws. At the junction of Oak Road and Ash Road is a nursery school.

Since 2016 the land to the north of High Carleton has been developed by Persimnon Homes as the Carleton Meadows and Woodberry Heights estates, which will eventually include a shop, community centre and primary school.  The streets on this development are to be named after flowers.  To the east of Carleton Meadows is the Carleton Manor Park development which is next to the grounds of Carleton Hill House and includes an apartment block as well as detached and semi-detached houses.

Next to Winters Park and adjoining the Pategill Estate is Carleton Hall Gardens and Carleton Hall Walk.

Cumbrian developers Story Homes have as of 2018 permission to build houses in the fields behind the Cross Keys Pub and the cottages that make up Carleton Village.

History 
Carleton Hall is the headquarters of the Cumbria Constabulary, but once was the home of the Carleton family, the last of whom died in the eighteenth century and during the first half of the twentieth century it was the home of the Carleton-Cowper family. The northern part of Carleton Hall's grounds are now divided between the Pategill housing estate and the Penrith Rugby Club. The manor of Carleton was held as a sub-manor of the larger manor or Honour of Penrith.

In years gone by Carleton was a prosperous hamlet, boasting Sir Thomas Carleton as a notable celebrity. The Cross Keys Pub was a stopping off point for travellers on both the Appleby road through to Stainmore (A66) and the A686 Alston road. Carleton at one stage had a Reading Room in the centre of the village and records show that the community here had annual harvest festivals and church services (possibly held in the Reading Room) or a makeshift wooden chapel (location unidentified) served by the Parish Church of St. Andrew, Penrith. In more recent times, prior to the development of High Carleton, the well-known Penrith greengrocery shop, Kerrs, used the land lying in present-day Frenchfield Way as its greenhouse produce fields. In those days the red sandstone walls on either side of Carleton Road leading uphill to the present day Oak Road junction were higher.

Amenities 
At Frenchfield just south of Carleton Village towards Brougham Castle is the Hunter Hall private preparatory school, Eden District Council-owned sports pitches and the new stadium for Penrith F.C.

To the west of Carleton Road is Winters Park where Penrith Rugby Union Football Club has its ground.

There is a veterinary surgery located at the junction of Carleton Hill Road and the A686.

A children's play area is situated at Beckside on High Carleton.

Local Government 
Most of Carleton lies within the Penrith Carleton wards of Eden District Council and Penrith Town Council with Parklands being within Penrith East Ward and Carleton Hall in Penrith Pategill Ward.  The whole suburb forms part of the Cumbria County Council division of Penrith East.  Historically Carleton has been one of the constablewicks or wards of the ancient parish of Penrith.

Transport  
Carleton Village is on the A686 road and is close to the Kemplay Bank roundabout where the A686 meets the A66 and the A6.

Carleton Road which was formerly the A66 and briefly numbered as a spur of the A686 is the main link road to the centre of Penrith.

The Penrith Town Service 646 bus service serves both High Carleton and the Carleton Hall area hourly from Monday to Saturday from morning to mid afternoon.

The nearest railway station is Penrith North Lakes over a mile away.

Notable people
 The 19th-century novelist, Frances Milton Trollope, mother of Anthony Trollope, lived briefly in a house called Carleton Hill just outside the village. She had the house built in 1840, but found the local climate too cold and sold the residence in 1843.
 Sir Stuart Donaldson, the first Premier of the Colony of New South Wales, died at Carleton Hall in January 1867.

References

Villages in Cumbria
Penrith, Cumbria